The Edge of Rock was a compilation released in 1990. It contains 10 tracks including covers of Suzanne Vega's "Luka," Status Quo's "Pictures of Matchstick Men," and The Cure's "Just Like Heaven."

Track listing 
 Camper Van Beethoven - "Pictures of Matchstick Men" (Francis Rossi) - 4:10
 Lucinda Williams - "I Just Wanted to See You So Bad" (Lucinda Williams) - 2:27
 Dinosaur Jr - "Just Like Heaven" (Simon Gallup/Robert Smith/Porl Thompson/Lol Tolhurst) - 2:55
 Winter Hours - "Roadside Flowers" (Michael Carlucci[Joseph Marques/Bob Perry) - 5:40
 Close Lobsters - "Lovely Little Swans" (Andrew Burnett/Tom Donnelly/Stewart McFayden/Bob Burnett/Graeme Wilmington) - 3:46
 Syd Straw - "Future 40's" (Jody Harris/Michael Stipe/Syd Straw) - 4:29
 Mary's Danish - "Can I Have a Smoke, Dude?" (Julie Ritter/Gretchen Seager/Chris Wagner) - 2:00
 Meat Puppets - "Light" (Curt Kirkwood) - 4:18
 The Lemonheads - "Luka" (Suzanne Vega) - 3:10
 Wire - "In Vivo" (Bruce Gilbert/Robert Gotobed/Graham Lewis/Colin Newman) - 4:36

References

1990 compilation albums
Covers albums
Alternative rock compilation albums